Polley may refer to:

Places
United States
Polley, Wisconsin

Surname
Dale Polley (born 1965), baseball player
Eugene Polley (died 2012), inventor of the first wireless remote control
George Polley, American pioneer of (the then-unnamed act of) buildering, or climbing the walls of tall buildings
Gerald Polley, political campaigner, singer, animator and alleged psychic
Horace N. Polley (1842-1914), American politician
Helen Polley (born 1957), Australian politician
Jacob Polley (born 1975), British poet
Margaret Polley (died 1555), English martyr
Michael Polley (born 1949), Australian politician
Prince Polley (born 1969), Ghanaian footballer
Sarah Polley (born 1979), Canadian actress, singer, film director and screenwriter
Stan Polley (died 2009), entertainment manager from the 1960s and 1970s
Teresa S. Polley, president and chief operating officer of the Financial Accounting Foundation
Tommy Polley (born 1978), American football player

Court cases
Polleys v. Black River Improvement Co.